Sun Piaoyang (born 1958) is a Chinese pharmaceutical executive and billionaire, the chairman of Jiangsu Hengrui Medicine.

Biography 
Sun has a bachelor's degree from China Pharmaceutical University and a doctoral degree from Nanjing University.

After taking over the formerly state-led Jiangsu Hengrui Medicine in 1990, he steered the company into becoming one of China's largest producers of anti-infection and anti-cancer medicines.

Sun is married to Zhong Huijuan (also a billionaire, with net worth of (May 2021) US$19.7 billion), chairwoman of the drugmaker Hansoh Pharmaceutical. They have one child, Sun Yuan.

References 

1958 births
Living people
Billionaires from Jiangsu
People from Lianyungang
Chinese company founders
Pharmaceutical company founders
China Pharmaceutical University alumni
Nanjing University alumni